Adam Steven Deacon (born 4 March 1983) is an English actor, rapper, writer and director. He is known for his lead role in the films Kidulthood, sequel Adulthood and for his directorial debut, Anuvahood.

Career
Deacon was brought up by his English mother in Stoke Newington, Hackney. His father is Moroccan.  His father walked out on the family when Deacon was two years old, and to this date the pair have never had any contact.

Although his acting career began with guest appearances in Bill's New Frock, Shooters, Ali G Indahouse and The Bill, he also starred in the ITV drama Wall of Silence in 2004.  Deacon's breakthrough came when he landed a starring role in the urban drama film Kidulthood. He then worked with the film's writer and director Noel Clarke on a number of other projects until 2011, including the sequel Adulthood, 4.3.2.1. and the one-off television pilot West 10 LDN.

Deacon co-wrote, co-directed and played the lead role in urban comedy Anuvahood. Following this, Time Out magazine labeled Deacon "The New Face of Youth Cinema". In February 2012, he won the BAFTA Rising Star Award.

Deacon has since appeared in many lead and supporting roles in feature films, including Bonded by Blood, Jack Falls, Shank, Everywhere and Nowhere and Payback Season. He had a guest role in Victim. In November 2012, he co-hosted the Music of Black Origin Awards telecast with Miquita Oliver where Deacon played a comical part in the awards. In May 2021, he appeared in an episode of the BBC soap opera Doctors as TK Nelson.

Legal issues
In July 2015, he was found guilty of harassment without violence at West London Magistrates' Court, having had a highly publicised feud with Noel Clarke with accusations of Clarke bullying him and sabotaging Deacon's career, which Clarke stated was not true. On 20 July, Deacon was found guilty. The court, which heard that Deacon had been diagnosed with bipolar disorder and had been self-medicating using skunk cannabis, banned Deacon from contacting Clarke again.

On 7 April 2016, he was arrested after police were called to reports of a man reportedly armed with a machete style knife and threatening members of the public in London. He was unable to attend a hearing in March due to being "in hospital for treatment for underlying mental health issues". On 7 April, a jury delivered two not-guilty verdicts for affray and possessing an offensive weapon accepting Deacon was mentally ill and not criminally responsible for his actions.

Filmography

Film

Television

Music videos

Discography

Singles
 "Keep Moving" (with Bashy, featuring Paloma Faith) (2010)
 "Hype Hype Ting" (with Boy Better Know and JME) (2011)
 "Do It" (featuring Professor Green) (2011)
 "People's Champion" (2012)
 "Flying High" (2012)
 '"Soldier" (2013)

References

External links
 

Male actors from London
Alumni of the Anna Scher Theatre School
BAFTA Rising Star Award winners
English male film actors
English male television actors
English people of Egyptian descent
English people of Moroccan descent
Grime music artists
Living people
People from Hackney Central
People with bipolar disorder
Rappers from London
English male web series actors
1983 births